Joachim Alcine (born March 26, 1976) is a Haitian-Canadian professional boxer fighting out of Montreal, Quebec, where he now resides. He is a former WBA light middleweight champion.

Professional career
Alcine defeated Jose Hilton Dos Santos on April 24, 2004, to win the WBA Fedelatin Light Middleweight Title, Fernando Hernandez on October 9, 2006, to win the NABA Light Middleweight Title and Elio Ortiz on May 28, 2005, to win the WBC International Light Middleweight Title. He has a professional record of 31-2 (with 19 wins by KO). On 2007-07-07, he became the WBA Light Middleweight champion after defeating Travis Simms by unanimous decision. He is now the WBO Inter-Continental Light Middleweight champion.  He is currently a training and sparring partner of mixed martial artist and current Ultimate Fighting Championship Welterweight champion Georges St-Pierre.

On December 7, 2007, he successfully defended his title by TKO in the 12th round against Panamanian Alfonso Mosquera at the Bell Centre in Montreal, Quebec, Canada. He lost the title to Daniel Santos on July 11, 2008, by KO.

Comeback
Alcine returned on August 28, 2009, year to beat Eric Mitchell by UD in which Mitchell came in over the contracted weight of 158 lbs, but Alcine agreed to go forward with the fight without penalty to Mitchell. Mitchell was also penalized one point for holding in round 9.

Then on December 5 Alcine beat Light Middleweight prospect Christophe Canclaux also by UD to win the WBO Inter-Continental Light Middleweight Title (vacated by Alfredo Angulo), Canclaux was penalized one point in round 2 for hitting behind the head.

Angulo vs. Alcine
Alcine lost to top Light Middleweight contender and Interim WBO Champion, Alfredo Angulo. The fight was for the vacant WBC Continental Americas Light Middleweight Title and was a WBC Final Elimination bout.

Alcine vs. Lemieux
In a huge upset, Alcine defeated Lemieux at the Bell Center, Montreal, on December 10, 2011. The fight was declared a majority decision over 12 rounds, awarding Alcine the WBC International Middleweight title. Most ringside observers thought Alcine totally dominated the fight.

Alcine vs. Macklin
On September 15, 2012 Alcine faced Irish brawler and two-time World Title challenger Matthew Macklin (at the time 28–4, 19 KO's) on the HBO PPV Undercard of Julio César Chávez Jr. vs. Sergio Martinez for the WBC Middleweight Title in the Thomas & Mack Center, Las Vegas. Macklin was coming off an extremely controversial split decision loss to WBA Super World Middleweight Champion Felix Sturm, and an 11th-round TKO loss to Lineal Middleweight champion Sergio Martinez on St. Patrick's day. Alcine was knocked down twice and the referee stopped the fight with about 30 seconds left in the round giving Macklin a 1st-round TKO victory. This was the fastest Alcine has ever been knocked out.

Professional boxing record

See also
List of world light-middleweight boxing champions

References

External links

 

|-

1976 births
Living people
Haitian male boxers
People from Gonaïves
Haitian emigrants to Canada
Naturalized citizens of Canada
Canadian male boxers
Black Canadian boxers
Haitian Quebecers
Boxers from Montreal
World light-middleweight boxing champions
World Boxing Association champions